Authenticity is a concept of personality in the fields of psychology, existential psychotherapy, existentialist philosophy, and aesthetics. In existentialism, authenticity is the degree to which a person's actions are congruent with his or her values and desires, despite external pressures to social conformity. The conscious Self comes to terms with the condition of Geworfenheit, of having been thrown into an absurd world (without values and without meaning) not of his or her own making, thereby encountering external forces and influences different from and other than the Self. In human relations, a person’s lack of authenticity is considered bad faith in dealing with other people and with one's self; thus, authenticity is in the instruction of the Oracle of Delphi: “Know thyself.” 

Concerning authenticity in art, the philosophers Jean Paul Sartre and Theodor Adorno held opposing views and opinions about jazz, a genre of American music; Sartre said that jazz is authentic and Adorno said that jazz is inauthentic. The musical subcultures of Punk rock and Heavy metal require artistic authenticity, lest the community consider an artist to be a poseur for lacking authenticity (creative, musical, personal); likewise, artistic authenticity is integral to the genres of House music, Grunge, and Garage rock, Hip-hop, Techno, and Show tunes. In every human activity, personal authenticity extends the instruction of the Oracle of Delphi: “Don’t merely know thyself — be thyself.”

History
In the 18th century, Romantic philosophers recommended intuition, emotion, and a connection to Nature as the necessary counterbalances to the intellectualism of the Age of Enlightenment. In the 20th century, Anglo–American preoccupations with authenticity centre upon the writings of existentialist philosophers whose native tongue is not English; therefore, the faithful, true, and accurate translation of the term existentialism was much debated, to which end the philosopher Walter Kaufmann assembled the canon of existentialist philosophers, which includes the Dane Søren Kierkegaard (1813–1855), the German Martin Heidegger (1889–1976), and the Frenchman Jean-Paul Sartre (1905–1980), for whom the conscious Self comes to terms with existence (being and living) in an absurd, materialist world featuring external forces, e.g.  Geworfenheit (Thrown-ness), and intellectual influences different from and other than the Self. Therefore, personal authenticity is in how a man or a woman acts and changes in response to the influences of the external world upon the Self. Among artists, authenticity in art describes a work of art that is faithful to the values of the artist. In the field of psychology, authenticity identifies a person living life in accordance with his or her true Self, personal values, rather than according to the external demands of society, such as social conventions, kinship, and duty.

Existential perspectives

Jean-Paul Sartre
Intelligible descriptions of the abstract concepts that constitute authenticity usually indicate the descriptive limits of language; thus, to describe the negative space surrounding the condition of being inauthentic, examples of inauthentic living illustrate the condition of being an authentic person. To that descriptive end, the novels of Jean-Paul Sartre are in language that makes authenticity conceptually intelligible through the stories of anti-heroic characters, men and women who base their actions upon external, psychological pressures — such as the social pressure to appear to be a certain kind of person; the pressure to adopt a given way of life; and the pressure to prostitute personal integrity (moral values and aesthetic standards) in exchange for the comfort (physical, mental, and moral) of social conformity. The novelist Sartre explains existential philosophy through the stories of  men and women who do not understand their own reasoning for acting as they do, people who ignore crucial facts about their own lives, in order to avoid unpleasant facts about being an inauthentic person with an identity defined from outside the self.

Absolute freedom is the vertiginous experience necessary for being an authentic person, yet such freedom can be so unpleasant as to impel people to choose an inauthentic life. As an aspect of authenticity, absolute freedom determines a person’s relation with the real world, a relation not based upon or determined by a system of values or an ideology. In this manner, authenticity is connected with creativity, and the will to act must be born of the person. In that vein, Heidegger speaks of absolute freedom as modes of living determined by personal choice. As a philosopher, Sartre identified, described, and explained what is an inauthentic existence in order to not define what is an authentic mode of living.

Søren Kierkegaard
Personal authenticity depends upon the person finding an authentic faith, and so be true to himself and to herself. That moral compromises inherent to the ideologies of bourgeois society and Christianity challenge the personal integrity of a person who seeks to live an authentic life, determined by the self. That a mass-culture society diminishes the significance of personal individuality, by way of social “levelling”, which is realised through news media that provide people with beliefs and opinions constructed by someone other than the self. A person can attain authentic faith by facing reality and choosing to live according to the facts of the material world, which is denied by passively accepting religious faith that excludes authentic thought from a person’s world-view. Kierkegaard’s philosophy of existentialism shows that personal authenticity is a personal choice based upon experience of the real world; thus, in Practice in Christianity (1850), Kierkegaard  said:

Friedrich Nietzsche
Personal authenticity can be achieved without religion, which requires accepting pre-determined virtues (eternal valuations) as unquestionably true. In living authentically, a person elevates himself or herself above the mass culture in order to transcend the limits of conventional morality, thereby personally determining what is and what is not good and evil, without the pre-determined virtues of conformity “on account of which we hold our grandfathers in esteem”; an authentic life is achieved by avoiding the “herding animal morality.” To “stand alone [is to be] strong and original enough to initiate opposite estimates of value, to transvaluate and invert ‘eternal valuations’.” Common to the existential perspectives of Kierkegaard and Nietzsche are “the responsibilities they place on the individual to take active part in the shaping of one’s beliefs, and then to be willing to act on that belief.”

Uriel Abulof
The call of personal authenticity — of being true to one’s self — conceals the chasms between the essential self and the existential self, which are psychologically divergent interpretations of the Self. Essentialist authenticity demands that a person find and follow a prescribed system of values in order to reach a pre-ordained destiny. Existentialist authenticity prescribes to the individual man and woman “determine your destiny!”, by being aware of the absolute freedom to choose. The essentialist person searches for signs of self-betrayal; the existentialist person asks: “How am I not myself?” and answers “Only when I act in bad faith”.

Erich Fromm
A very different definition of authenticity was proposed by Erich Fromm in the mid-1900s. He considered behavior of any kind, even that wholly in accord with societal mores, to be authentic if it results from personal understanding and approval of its drives and origins, rather than merely from conformity with the received wisdom of the society.  Thus a Frommean authentic may behave consistently in a manner that accords with cultural norms, for the reason that those norms appear on consideration to be appropriate, rather than simply in the interest of conforming with current norms. Fromm thus considers authenticity to be a positive outcome of enlightened and informed motivation rather than a negative outcome of rejection of the expectations of others. He described the latter condition – the drive primarily to escape external restraints typified by the "absolute freedom" of Sartre – as "the illusion of individuality", as opposed to the genuine individuality that results from authentic living.

Musical subculture

Artistic authenticity is required of the artist who would be a denizen of the subcultures of  punk rock and heavy metal, which are societies that criticize and exclude musicians, composers, and bands for being poseurs — for being insufficiently authentic or plainly inauthentic as artists. A poseur is a man or a woman or a musical band who copies the dress, the style of speech, and the manners of the subculture, yet is excluded for not understanding the artistic philosophy, not understanding the sociology, and not understanding the value system of the subculture; talking the talk, without walking the walk.

The authenticity of an artist has three bases: (i) long-term dedication to the music scene; (ii) historical knowledge of the subculture; and (iii) the personal integrity (inner voice) for correct artistic choices. At the extreme metal end of the heavy-metal genre, the subgenre of black metal who value artistic authenticity, emotional sincerity, and extreme expression. In light of such systems of moral value in the arts, a working-class band with a formal recording contract might appear to be sell outs to the heavy metal and punk rock communities. The academic Deena Weinstein said that “The code of authenticity, which is central to the heavy metal subculture, is demonstrated in many ways”, such as clothing, an emotional singing voice, and thematic substance to the songs.

Journalism
To identify, describe, and define authenticity, existential philosophers, such as Søren Kierkegaard (1813–1855), Friedrich Nietzsche (1844–1900), and Martin Heidegger (1889 –1976) investigated the existential and ontological significance of the social constructs that are the norms of society. For a journalist, aversion to and turning away from the unquestioning acceptance of social norms contributes to the production of intellectually authentic reportage, achieved by the reporter choosing to be true to his and her professional ethics and personal values. Yet in the praxis of journalism, the reporter’s authenticity (professional and personal) is continually contradicted by the business requirements of corporate publishing.

Criticism
The philosopher Jacob Golomb argues that existential authenticity is a way of life incompatible with a system of moral values that comprehends all persons.

See also

References

Further reading
 Erich Fromm. Escape from Freedom; Routledge & Kegan Paul 1942
 Lionel Trilling. Sincerity and Authenticity; ; Harvard UP 1974
 Charles Taylor. The Ethics of Authenticity; ; Harvard UP 1992
 Alessandro Ferrara. Reflective Authenticity; ; Routledge 1998
 James Leonard Park. Becoming More Authentic: The Positive Side of Existentialism; ; Existential Books 2007—5th edition
  Achim Saupe. Authenticity, Version: 3, in: Docupedia Zeitgeschichte, 12. April 2016; DOI
 Marcello Sorce Keller, “How we got into ‘authenticity’ and ‘originality’ thinking, and why we should find a way out of it”, in Thomas Claviez, Kornelia Imesch, Britta Sweers (Eds.), Critique of Authenticity. Wilmington, DE: Vernon Press, 2010,  pp. 135–158.

Martin Heidegger
Existentialist concepts
Aesthetics
Philosophy of music